Prince of the Deep Water was the first of two studio albums by British band The Blessing. Released by MCA Records in 1991, it included the band's only UK Top 40 hit single, "Highway 5". The album was recorded and produced by Neil Dorfsman and mastered by Bob Ludwig. "Highway 5" initially reached #42 on the UK Singles Chart. The single was remixed and re-released at the end of the year, and early in 1992 re-charted, this time peaking at #30. Prince of the Deep Water featured guest musicians Nicky Hopkins, Richard Tee, Jeff Porcaro, Rickie Lee Jones, and Bruce Hornsby, and went on to sell 125,000 copies.

Track listing 
 "Highway 5"
 "Flames"
 "Hurricane Room"
 "Baby"
 "Let's Make Love"
 "Back From Managua"
 "I Want You"
 "Delta Rain"
 "Birdhouse"
 "Denial"
 "Prince of the Deep Water"

Personnel 
William Topley – vocals
Luke Brighty – guitars
Mike Westergaard – keyboards 
Kevin Hime-Knowles – bass guitars
Simon Hanson – drums
Perri, Rebecca Price, Reginald Brisbon – additional vocals

References 

1991 debut albums
MCA Records albums